Ebony Tears was a Swedish death metal band that started out playing melodic death metal which was prevalent in the Swedish death metal scene at the time, bearing a strong resemblance to the latter-day sound of At the Gates.

With their final album, however, the band had begun to play a more modern thrash style of metal, very much akin to the bands which formed in the wake of the demise of At the Gates, namely The Haunted.

Ebony Tears has since disbanded subsequent to the release of their final album, Evil as Hell in 2001. The album was also released on the Century Media Records label. All members went on to join Dog Faced Gods.

Discography

 Tortura Insomniae (1997)
 Handful of Nothing (1999)
 Evil as Hell (2001)

Credits
 Richard Evensand − Drums (ex-Chimaira, Dog Faced Gods, ex-Southpaw, ex-Soilwork, Sorcerer, Demonoid)
 Conny Jonsson − Guitar (Dog Faced Gods)
 Peter Kahm − Bass (Dog Faced Gods)
 Johnny Wranning − Vocals (Miscreant, Dog Faced Gods, Eyetrap, ex-Månegarm)

References

External links
 Ebony Tears at Black Sun Records

Swedish thrash metal musical groups
Swedish melodic death metal musical groups
Musical groups established in 1996
Musical groups disestablished in 2001